Vardij (also Romanized as Vardīj; also known as Wārdi) is a village in Sulqan Rural District of Kan District of Tehran County, Tehran province, Iran. At the 2006 National Census, its population was 281 in 77 households. The following census in 2011 counted 461 people in 144 households. The latest census in 2016 showed a population of 778 people in 271 households; it was the largest village in its rural district.

This village is very popular for its "stone giants." The stones of the mountains have the appearance of giant human heads.

References 

Tehran County

Populated places in Tehran Province

Populated places in Tehran County